Christopher J. Keane is an American physicist and astronomer currently at Washington State University and an Elected Fellow of the American Association for the Advancement of Science.

References

Year of birth missing (living people)
Living people
Fellows of the American Association for the Advancement of Science
21st-century American physicists
Washington State University faculty
Princeton University alumni
University of Rochester alumni